Evil Empire is the second studio album by American rock band Rage Against the Machine, released by Epic Records on April 16, 1996. It debuted at number 1 on the US Billboard 200 chart with sales of 249,000 copies, and the song "Tire Me" won a 1996 Grammy Award for Best Metal Performance; "Bulls on Parade" and "People of the Sun" were nominated for Grammys for Best Hard Rock Performance. On May 24, 2000, the album was certified triple platinum by the Recording Industry Association of America.

The album's title is a reference to a term used in the early 1980s by President Ronald Reagan and many American conservatives to describe the Soviet Union.

Background
According to MTV News, "The title 'Evil Empire' is taken from what Rage Against The Machine see as Ronald Reagan's slander of the Soviet Union in the eighties, which the band feels could just as easily apply to the United States."

Before the May 27, 1996, performance of "Without a Face" that is featured on the band's 1998 Live & Rare album, Zack de la Rocha said: "It seems as if soon as the... the wall in Germany fell, that the US government was busy building another one on the border between the US and Mexico. Since 1986, as a result of a lot of the hate talk and hysteria that the government of the United States has been speaking, 1,500 bodies have been found on the border. We wrote this song in response to it."

"Year of tha Boomerang" had previously been included in the film Higher Learning, though its title was written as "Year of the Boomerang" on the packaging of the film's soundtrack, as well as that of the song's promotional single.

Packaging
The cover of the album features an altered version of a painting of the 1940s–1950s comic book hero Crimebuster done by Mel Ramos, with the emblem on the boy's costume changed from a "c" to a lowercase "e", the caption "Crime Buster" changed to the album's title, and the color of the star in the background changed. Additional artwork for the album was created by Barbara Kruger, some of which appears in the video for "Bulls on Parade".

The album's CD booklet includes a picture of a pile of various political and philosophical books, which include:

 A People's History of the United States by Howard Zinn
 Capital, Volume I by Karl Marx 
 A Portrait of the Artist as a Young Man by James Joyce
 The Anarchist Cookbook by William Powell
 Guerrilla Warfare by Che Guevara
 Revolutionary Suicide by Huey P. Newton
 Soul on Ice by Eldridge Cleaver
 The Wretched of the Earth by Frantz Fanon
 Darkness at Noon by Arthur Koestler
 Manufacturing Consent: The Political Economy of the Mass Media by Edward S. Herman and Noam Chomsky
 Live from Death Row by Mumia Abu-Jamal
 Johnny Got His Gun by Dalton Trumbo
 Now and After: The ABC of Communist Anarchism by Alexander Berkman
 The Grapes of Wrath by John Steinbeck
 Rules for Radicals by Saul D. Alinsky
 Soledad Brother: The Prison Letters of George Jackson by George Jackson
 Walden and Resistance to Civil Government by Henry David Thoreau
 Invisible Man by Ralph Ellison
 Another Country by James Baldwin

Promotion
In 1995, the band sent a free 7″ record to everyone who signed up for the fan club promoted in the liner notes of their debut. Doubling as an apology to those who had received nothing and a promotion for the upcoming album, it came in a plain cardboard-colored fold-out with a black-and-white American flag on the cover alongside the band's name and "Evil Empire" in capital letters. On the back cover was a UPC with marker scribble on the barcode. The A-side was a reissue of the Evening Session-version of "Bombtrack" first broadcast on June 7, 1993 (listed as "Bombtrack (Live on the BBC)"), and the B-side was a then-unreleased cover of N.W.A's "Fuck tha Police" that was recorded live on August 13, 1995, at a benefit concert for Mumia Abu-Jamal at the Capitol Ballroom in Washington, D.C. As with the band's debut, five singles were released in total.

Reception

Rolling Stone said that "This music isn't supposed to be fun," and continued: "Rage Against the Machine have jacked up the sociopolitical siege mentality in their metallic hip-hop to such a dogmatic degree – and honed their sound to such maniacally shrill perfection – that the band and the roaring joys of its harangue 'n' roll seem virtually sexless."

Track listing

Personnel
Rage Against the Machine
 Zack de la Rocha – vocals
 Tom Morello – guitars
 Tim Commerford (credited as "Tim Bob") – bass
 Brad Wilk – drums

Technical
 Brendan O'Brien – production
 Rage Against the Machine – co-production
 Andy Wallace – mixing
 Nick DiDia – engineering, recording
 Caram Costanzo – engineering
 Clay Harper – assistant engineering
 Dave Rat – recording ("Down Rodeo" vocals)
 Paul Kosky – recording ("Down Rodeo" vocals)
 Bob Ludwig – mastering

Artwork and design
 Rage Against the Machine – art direction
 Aimée Macauley – art direction
 Lisa Johnson – photography

Recording locations
 Cole Rehearsal Studios, Los Angeles, CA – recording
 Kiss Music Recording Studios, Melbourne, Australia – recording ("Down Rodeo" vocals)
 The Enterprise – mixing
 Gateway Mastering Studios – mastering

Charts

Weekly charts

Year-end charts

Certifications

Awards
 1997 Grammy Award – Best Metal Performance for "Tire Me"

See also
 Ronald Reagan in music

References

External links
 

1996 albums
Albums produced by Brendan O'Brien (record producer)
Epic Records albums
Rage Against the Machine albums